Hums of the Lovin' Spoonful is the third studio album and fourth overall by American folk rock band the Lovin' Spoonful, released in 1966 by Kama Sutra Records. It peaked at No. 14 on the Billboard Pop Albums chart.

Background
Hums was a deliberate attempt by the band to record in a variety of styles. They composed and played in the pop, country, jug-band, blues and folk styles. It would ultimately be the last full project by the original lineup. The band recorded most of the album at Columbia Records' 7th Avenue Studio and Bell Sound in Midtown Manhattan, New York. Additional recording was done in Los Angeles, including "Lovin' You", which was recorded in Los Angeles.

The album managed to spawn four charting singles for the band, including the No. 1 hit "Summer in the City". "Rain on the Roof", "Nashville Cats", and "Full Measure" also appeared on the Pop charts, all but the last making it to the Top 10. Bobby Darin had a Top 40 hit with a cover version of "Lovin' You". Johnny Cash and June Carter Cash later covered "Darlin' Companion" in 1969 on Johnny Cash at San Quentin. Principal songwriter John Sebastian said of "Nashville Cats" — which made No. 8 on the Billboard Hot 100 — "We thought our version would cross over to the country market. It never did. So we're always kind, gee, well I guess that tells us what we are and what we aren't." Flatt & Scruggs took "Nashville Cats" to No. 54 on the country charts as a single. Dolly Parton covered "Lovin' You" for her 1977 album Here You Come Again.

Hums of the Lovin' Spoonful was re-released in 2003 on the Sundazed label with bonus tracks consisting of four demos, instrumental tracks, and alternate versions/mixes of songs from the album, along with extensive liner notes. It was also released on CD along with Do You Believe in Magic? in 1995.

Reception

William Ruhlman of AllMusic wrote of the album: "An emphasis on the parts of the album is a way of describing it as more a loose collection of disparate tracks than a unified effort, despite Sebastian's hand in all the compositions and his lead vocals on most of them. This was by necessity, but also by design, since Sebastian and co. went into the studio trying to sound completely different each time. They often succeeded..."

Cash Box said of the single "Rain on the Roof" that it got "away from the raunchy 'Summer In The City' sound and back to their soft-rock stylings," and that they expected it to be successful.

Track listing
All songs written by John Sebastian except where otherwise noted.

Side one
"Lovin' You" – 2:25
"Bes' Friends" – 1:52
"Voodoo in My Basement" – 2:35
"Darlin' Companion" – 2:22
"Henry Thomas" – 1:40
"Full Measure" (Steve Boone, J. Sebastian) – 2:40

Side two
"Rain on the Roof" – 2:13
"Coconut Grove" (J. Sebastian, Zal Yanovsky) – 2:38
"Nashville Cats" – 2:34
"4 Eyes" – 2:53
"Summer in the City" (J. Sebastian, Mark Sebastian, Boone) – 2:39

2003 Reissue bonus tracks
"Darlin' Companion (Solo Demo)" – 2:20
"Rain on the Roof (Instrumental)" – 2:17 
"4 Eyes (Alternate Vocal/Extended Version)" – 3:38
"Full Measure (Instrumental)" (Boone, J. Sebastian) – 2:41
"Voodoo in My Basement (Instrumental)" – 2:40
"Darlin' Companion (Alternate Vocal/Alternate Mix)" – 2:25

Personnel
John Sebastian – lead (1, 2, 4, 5, 7-12, 14, 17) and backing vocals, guitar, twelve-string guitar, autoharp, piano, organ, harmonium (2), ocarina (5), pedal steel guitar (4, 7, 8, 13, 17), Irish harp
Zal Yanovsky – electric and acoustic guitars, backing and lead (3) vocals, banjo (2, 5), slide whistle (5)
Steve Boone – electric bass, double bass, piano, organ, percussion
Joe Butler – drums, backing and lead (6) vocals, percussion
Henry Diltz – clarinet (2)
Artie Schroeck – electric piano (11)
Larry Hankin – Jew's harp (5)

Production
Erik Jacobsen – producer
Roy Halee – engineer
Henry Diltz - photography

Charts and certifications

Notes

References

Sources

External links
 The Lovin' Spoonful at Classicbands.com
 Lovin' Spoonful Official Website

The Lovin' Spoonful albums
1966 albums
Kama Sutra Records albums
Albums produced by Erik Jacobsen